When London Burns is the first DVD released by American death metal band Deicide. It was released on March 7, 2006, by Earache Records. The extra features include a documentary entitled Behind the Scars, which discusses the production of the album Scars of the Crucifix. The Hoffman brothers left Deicide five days before the concert was recorded.

Track listing
Recorded live at The Mean Fiddler, London, England on November 29, 2004.
"Scars of the Crucifix" – 3:23
"They Are the Children of the Underworld" – 3:10
"Bastard of Christ" – 3:02
"When Satan Rules His World" – 3:08
"Once Upon the Cross" – 3:14
"Kill the Christian" – 3:18
"Serpents of the Light" – 3:05
"Dead but Dreaming" – 3:21
"Lunatic of God's Creation" – 2:49
"Sacrificial Suicide" – 3:17
"When Heaven Burns" – 3:54
"Dead by Dawn" – 4:21
"Behind the Light Thou Shall Rise" – 3:02
"Deicide" – 4:18
"Crucifixation" – 5:26
"Christ Denied" – 3:25
"Oblivious to Evil" – 3:03
"Behind the Scars" documentary – 30:00

"Behind the Scars" includes a look behind the scenes as Deicide record Scars of the Crucifix, candid interviews at home with the band and backstage, exclusive footage from the rehearsal room, and the formation of Deicide and Glen Benton's forehead branding explained.

Personnel
Glen Benton – bass, lead vocals
Steve Asheim – drums
Jack Owen – guitars
Dave Suzuki – guitars, backing vocals

External links
 

Deicide (band) video albums
2006 live albums
Live video albums
2006 video albums
Documentary films about heavy metal music and musicians